In Silence We Yearn is the second studio album by the Swedish post-rock band Oh Hiroshima, self-released digitally in November 2015. The album was re-released on CD on 1 July 2016 by Fluttery Records and on vinyl on 2 December by Napalm Records. In December 2016, American webzine Somewherecold ranked In Silence We Yearn No. 9 on their "Somewherecold Awards 2016" list.

Track listing

Personnel
 Jakob Hemström – guitars and vocals
 Leif Eliasson – guitars
 Oskar Nilsson – drums
 Simon Axelsson – bass guitar

References

External links
 In Silence We Yearn by Oh Hiroshima on Bandcamp

2015 albums
Oh Hiroshima albums